Matheus Mancini (born 14 September 1994) is a Brazilian professional footballer who plays as a central defender for Ituano.

Club career
Born in São Paulo, Mancini started his youth career at Olé Brasil and went on loan to Comercial in 2012. In 2013 he joined Botafogo-SP and had a brief loan spell at Grêmio's under-20 team in 2014. He made his senior debut on 8 April 2015, coming on as a substitute for Botafogo in a 3–1 away win against Mogi Mirim, for that year's Campeonato Paulista. Later that year, Botafogo were crowned champions of the Campeonato Brasileiro Série D.

On 18 April 2017, Mancini transferred to Atlético Mineiro on a two-year contract. He was initially assigned to the reserve squad, but joined the senior team after one month. He made his debut for the club on 25 June 2017, playing the full 90 minutes of the 1–0 away win over Chapecoense, for the Série A. He finished his first season at Atlético with a total of six appearances.

On 20 August 2018, Mancini joined Série B club Londrina on loan from Atlético.

Personal life
He is the son of former footballer and current manager Vágner Mancini.

Honours
Botafogo-SP
Campeonato Brasileiro Série D: 2015

 Confiança
Campeonato Sergipano: 2020

References

External links
Matheus Mancini at Atlético Mineiro's official website 

Living people
1994 births
Footballers from São Paulo
Brazilian footballers
Association football defenders
Campeonato Brasileiro Série A players
Campeonato Brasileiro Série C players
Campeonato Brasileiro Série D players
Botafogo Futebol Clube (SP) players
Clube Atlético Mineiro players
Londrina Esporte Clube players
Liga Portugal 2 players
Associação Académica de Coimbra – O.A.F. players
Associação Desportiva Confiança players
Brazilian expatriate footballers
Brazilian expatriate sportspeople in Portugal
Expatriate footballers in Portugal